West Virginia Route 39 is an east–west state highway in West Virginia. The western terminus of the route is at U.S. Route 60 and West Virginia Route 16 in Gauley Bridge.

Major intersections

References

039
Transportation in Fayette County, West Virginia
Transportation in Nicholas County, West Virginia
Transportation in Greenbrier County, West Virginia
Transportation in Pocahontas County, West Virginia